Granville Augustus William Waldegrave, 3rd Baron Radstock (10 April 1833 – 8 December 1913) was a British missionary and a baron in the Peerage of Ireland.

Biography
Waldegrave was born in 1833, the only son of Granville Waldegrave, 2nd Baron Radstock and his wife Esther Caroline Paget. He became the 3rd Baron Radstock on the death of his father in 1857. On 25 April 1860, he was promoted to lieutenant colonel in the West Middlesex Volunteer Rifle Corps. He resigned his commission at the end of October 1866.

As a result of a spiritual crisis during the Crimean War, Radstock with his wife joined the Plymouth brothers' "free" church in Bristol. It was a community of the so-called Open Brethren, led by prominent theologian and missionary George Müller.
Radstock was missionary during the "Great Russian Awakening". In 1874, he travelled to St Petersburg as part of his missionary work, trips that were repeated in 1875–76, and in 1878.

Marriage and children
Radstock married Susan Charlotte Calcraft (1833–1892) on 16 July 1858 in Holy Trinity Church, Marylebone, London. She was the youngest daughter of John Hales Calcraft, MP for Wareham, and Lady Caroline Montagu, daughter of William Montagu, 5th Duke of Manchester. In 1889, they acquired the Mayfield estate in Weston, Southampton.

Lord and Lady Radstock had nine children:

 Granville George Waldegrave, 4th Baron Radstock (born 1 September 1859, died 2 April 1937)
 Hon Katherine Waldegrave (born 1860, died 4 December 1874)
 Hon Edith Caroline Waldegrave (born 1862, died 15 November 1925)
 Hon Mabel Waldegrave (born 1863, died 12 December 1929)
 Hon Constance Waldegrave (born 1865, died 19 June 1945)
 An unnamed son (born and died 1866)
 Montague Waldegrave, 5th Baron Radstock (born 15 July 1867, died 17 September 1953)
 Hon John Waldegrave (born 30 December 1868, died 4 April 1901)
 Hon Mary Waldegrave (born 1870)

Death
Lord Radstock died in Paris on 8 December 1913 and was succeeded in the peerage by his eldest son, Granville.

Arms

References

Sources
 

1833 births
1913 deaths
Clergy from London
British Plymouth Brethren
Barons in the Peerage of Ireland
Granville Waldegrave, 3rd Baron Radstock
British Army personnel of the Crimean War
British Militia officers